Tulumbasy is a rural locality (a settlement) in Asovskoye Rural Settlement, Beryozovsky District, Perm Krai, Russia. The population was 109 as of 2010. There are 7 streets.

Geography 
Tulumbasy is located 32 km southeast of  Beryozovka (the district's administrative centre) by road. Sosnovka is the nearest rural locality.

References 

Rural localities in Beryozovsky District, Perm Krai